Nostima negramaculata is a species of shore flies. It is found in New Zealand.

References

External links
 iNaturalist

Diptera of New Zealand
Ephydridae
Insects described in 2007